Geard Ajetović (born February 28, 1981 in Beočin) is a boxer from Serbia. He represented Serbia and Montenegro at the 2000 Summer Olympics in Sydney, Australia, where he lost in the first round of the Men's Welterweight (– 67 kg) competition to Thailand's veteran Parkpoom Jangphonak due to a controversial 9-9 point decision. Ajetović won a bronze medal at the 2001 Mediterranean Games in Tunis, Tunisia.

Biography
Geard Ajetović grew up in the former Republic of Yugoslavia and started boxing at the age of 8. After a successful amateur career including numerous national championships, a gold medal at the Junior European Championships and silver at the Junior World Championships he turned professional in 2000 soon after the Olympic Games.  He moved to Liverpool where he spent the first 10 years of his professional career.  Due to a knee injury Ajetovic was forced to a take a 2-year break from fighting, but had a successful comeback at the end of 2010.  In January 2011 Ajetovic won the vacant WBC Mediterranean title by a first-round knockout victory over Jackson Chanet, having moving up to light heavyweight for that fight.

Professional record

References

1981 births
Living people
Welterweight boxers
Boxers at the 2000 Summer Olympics
Olympic boxers of Yugoslavia
Serbian male boxers

Mediterranean Games bronze medalists for Serbia
Competitors at the 2001 Mediterranean Games
Mediterranean Games medalists in boxing
People from Beočin